Woodland Christian High School (WCHS) is a secondary school located in Breslau, Ontario, Canada. Founded in 1976 by a group of churches in the Cambridge area, Woodland provides Christian-based education. For several years, it operated from several Church facilities in the Cambridge and Kitchener–Waterloo areas.  In 1979, the school moved into its current location. The facility has had multiple expansions and renovations which took place in 2002 and 2014.

Woodland draws students from an area bounded by Ayr, Cambridge, Rockwood, New Dundee, Listowel, Drayton, and Waterloo encompassing Kitchener and Guelph.

Woodland's sports teams, the Cavaliers, compete in District 8 Athletic Association of the Central Western Ontario Secondary Schools Association, as well as the Ontario Christian Secondary Schools Athletic Association. Cavalier teams include girls' and boys' volleyball, basketball, soccer, badminton, cross-country, track & field and ultimate.

Woodland is a member of the Ontario Alliance of Christian Schools.

Notable alumni 

 Sam Thomson

References

External links
 Woodland Christian High School

Educational institutions established in 1976
High schools in the Regional Municipality of Waterloo
Private schools in Ontario
Christian schools in Canada
1976 establishments in Ontario